Fastly is an American cloud computing services provider. It describes its network as an edge cloud platform, which is designed to help developers extend their core cloud infrastructure to the edge of the network, closer to users. The Fastly edge cloud platform includes their content delivery network (CDN), image optimization, video and streaming, cloud security, and load balancing services. Fastly's cloud security services include denial-of-service attack protection, bot mitigation, and a web application firewall. Fastly's web application firewall uses the Open Web Application Security Project ModSecurity Core Rule Set alongside its own ruleset.

The Fastly platform is built on top of Varnish. As of December 2021, Fastly transfers 50–100Tbps of data.

History
Fastly was founded in 2011 by the Swedish-American entrepreneur Artur Bergman, previously chief technical officer at Wikia (now Fandom). In June 2013, Fastly raised $10 million in Series B funding. In April 2014, the company announced that it had acquired CDN Sumo, a CDN add-on for Heroku. In September 2014, Fastly raised a further $40 million in Series C funding, followed by a $75 million Series D round in August 2015.

In September 2015, Google partnered with Fastly and other content delivery network providers to offer services to its users. In April 2017, Fastly launched its edge cloud platform along with image optimization, load balancing, and a web application firewall.

Fastly raised $50 million in funding in April 2017, and another $40 million in July 2018. The company filed for an initial public offering (IPO) in April 2019 and debuted on the New York Stock Exchange on May 17, 2019. In February 2020, Bergman stepped down as CEO and assumed the role of chief architect and executive chairperson; Joshua Bixby took over the CEO role.

In August 2020, Fastly announced it was acquiring cybersecurity company Signal Sciences for $775 million ($200 million in cash and $575 million in stock).

In June 2021, Ronald W. Kisling, previously employed by Alphabet as the CFO of the Fitbit division, was hired to serve as Fastly's CFO, succeeding Adriel Lares. He assumed the position in August 2021.

In May 2022, Fastly announced it had acquired Glitch, a web coding platform with more than 1.8 million developers.

In August 2022, Todd Nightingale, previously employed by Cisco as Executive Vice President of Enterprise Networking and Cloud business, was hired to serve as Fastly's CEO, succeeding Joshua Bixby.

Operation
Fastly's CDN service follows the reverse proxy model, routing all website traffic through their own servers instead of providing a 'cdn.mydomain.com' address to store site-specific files. It then fetches content from the point of presence nearest to the location of the requesting user, out of nearly 60 worldwide. It is priced as a pay-as-you-go service subject to a US$50 per month minimum charge, with bandwidth charged at variable rates depending on region. Content is not directly uploaded to their servers, rather it is pulled periodically from the origin server and cached in order to reduce the time required for an end-user to access the content.

Fastly supports the UDP-based HTTP/3 protocol, as well as DRM enabled content, encryption and secure tokens to restrict media access.

On 8 June 2021, Fastly reported problems with their CDN service which caused many major websites, such as Reddit, gov.uk, Twitch, Spotify and Amazon, along with major news sources such as The New York Times, The Guardian, CNN and the BBC, to become unavailable. Affected tech news outlet The Verge resorted to using Google Docs to report on the ongoing outage. It also affected certain parts of other major websites, such as the servers hosting the emojis used by Twitter, resulting in them becoming inaccessible. The outage was resolved by Fastly after a few hours. Fastly has since stated that the cause of the outage was a software bug triggered by a specific user configuration.

References

External links

2011 establishments in California
2019 initial public offerings
American companies established in 2011
Cloud computing providers
Cloud platforms
Companies based in San Francisco
Companies listed on the New York Stock Exchange
Computer security companies
Content delivery networks
DDoS mitigation companies
Internet properties established in 2011
Internet security
Software companies based in the San Francisco Bay Area
Software companies established in 2011
Software companies of the United States